Birdpur or Birdpore refers to several villages in Siddharthnagar district, Uttar Pradesh, India, each of which has the same name, followed by a number. 

 Birdpur No. 1
 Birdpur No. 2
 Birdpur No. 3
 Birdpur No. 4
 Birdpur No. 5
 Birdpur No. 6
 Birdpur No. 7
 Birdpur No. 8
 Birdpur No. 9
 Birdpur No. 10
 Birdpur No. 11
 Birdpur No. 12
 Birdpur No. 13
 Birdpur No. 14